"Danny Goes to Mars" is a science fiction short story by American writer Pamela Sargent. It was first published in Isaac Asimov's Science Fiction Magazine, in October 1992.

Plot summary
After new developments in rocket propulsion enable a trip to Mars to be completed in weeks instead of months, Vice-President Dan Quayle is persuaded to join the crew of the first mission — and becomes its sole survivor.

Reception
"Danny Goes to Mars" won the Nebula Award for Best Novelette of 1992, and was a finalist for the 1993 Hugo Award for Best Novelette.

Paul Di Filippo described it as "wicked satire". The Sun-Sentinel considered it to be "affectionate", noting that although "Sargent gently mocks Quayle's intellectual and spiritual limitations", she also portrays him as having genuine courage; similarly, Mark Pitcavage considered Quayle "a likeable and earnest dimbulb". Geoffrey Landis, writing in 1993, described it as "amusing (but) outdated".

References

Works originally published in Asimov's Science Fiction
Nebula Award for Best Novelette-winning works
1992 short stories
Short stories set on Mars
Dan Quayle
Alternate history short stories